The Oaklands railway line is a freight-only railway line in north-eastern Victoria, Australia. The line branches from the main North East railway at Benalla station and runs across the Victoria-New South Wales border to the town of Oaklands, New South Wales.

History
The first section of line opened in 1883 as a  branch line to St James, at the same time as the extension of the main line to Albury in New South Wales. In 1886, the line was extended another  to Yarrawonga, on the southern bank of the Murray River, which formed the colonial and, later, the state boundary between Victoria and New South Wales.

Under the 1922 Border Railways Act, the line was extended another 61 kilometres to Oaklands, New South Wales, where it met the existing New South Wales branch line, thereby becoming a break-of-gauge location. Although the construction of the extension was completed in 1932, trains on it were operated by the Railway Construction Branch, mostly using a rail tractor as motive power, until the line was formally handed over to the Victorian Railways in August 1938. There was no turntable at the terminus, so steam locomotives had to operate tender-first when running to Oaklands.

During World War II, additional sidings of both Victorian broad gauge and NSW standard gauge were provided, to serve Australian defence installations which were located at Oaklands. There was no passenger service to Oaklands at first but, in December 1946, a twice-weekly service began, operated by a rail motor. That service had been discontinued by the early 1950s.

The last regular passenger service on the line was between Benalla and Yarrawonga on Saturday 9 December 1978, operated by DERM 56RM.

With the opening of the North East standard gauge line in 1961, the line had standard gauge track at both ends, in addition to the broad gauge via Benalla. Gauge conversion of the line was proposed at various times, including by the Victorian State Government in 2001 with a proposed completion data of late 2003. The last broad gauge train to run on the line was a Pacific National grain service in May 2007.

In 2008, agreement was reached to convert the North East railway line from broad gauge to standard gauge, which would have left the Oaklands branch as an isolated and useless spur.
The local MP reported that the cost of converting this  branch to standard gauge was just over $13m. In October 2008 the Victorian State Government announced that an upgrade would take place. 
The conversion was completed in December 2009, at a cost of $16.5 million, with nearly 50,000 sleepers replaced. The first revenue service on the converted line was an El Zorro grain train on 10 March.

More recently, the line has seen numerous grain trains from both Pacific National and Southern Shorthaul Railroad. The line has continued to deteriorate during this time, with numerous bouts of emergency repairs carried out on the line during 2021; the line now has a 30kph speed limit from Benalla to Yarrawonga, and a 20kph limit from Yarrawonga to Oaklands. It also has a 10kph limit for the final 9 km of the line into Oaklands. As at 28 November 2021 trains are banned from using the line between the hours of 1200 and 2000 if the Yarrawonga weather forecast is 32 °C or higher.

Traffic
The line carries seasonal grain traffic. There is no passenger service. In the 2000s, a potential new source of traffic on the line was noted, with the opening of coal mines in the area.

Stations
 Benalla - junction
 Goorambat - silo
 Devenish - silo
 St James - silo
 Tungamah - silo
 Telford - silo
 Yarrawonga - silo
(border) Murray River bridge, replaced 1989
 Mulwala
 Sloane - silo
 Warragoon - silo
 Rennie - silo
 Sangar - silo
 Wangamong - silo
 Oaklands - AWB and Grainco silos

See also
 Oaklands railway line, New South Wales
 Railpage Australia - Discussions and reports covering Freight Traffic on the Railway Line
 Railpage Australia - Discussions on the conversion of the line from Broad Gauge to Standard Gauge
 List of gauge conversions

Sources
 NSWrail.net: List of stations and maps of the line

References

Freight railway lines in Victoria (Australia)
Railway lines opened in 1883
Standard gauge railways in Australia